The Sherman Brothers Songbook is a compilation album of songs written by composer-lyricist duo Richard M. Sherman and Robert B. Sherman. It includes the Sherman Brothers' work for Disney as well as their non-Disney output.  It was released on CD on October 13, 2009.

Track listing

References

Works by the Sherman Brothers
Compilation albums by American artists
2009 compilation albums
Walt Disney Records compilation albums